The 1928 Utah gubernatorial election was held on November 6, 1928. Incumbent Democrat George Dern defeated Republican nominee William Henry Wattis with 58.50% of the vote.

General election

Candidates
Major party candidates
George Dern, Democratic
William Henry Wattis, Republican 

Other candidates
D.C. Dora, Socialist

Results

References

1928
Utah
Gubernatorial